The taekwondo competition at the 2014 Central American and Caribbean Games was held in Veracruz, Mexico.

The tournament was scheduled to be held from 15–18 November at the World Trade Center Veracruz.

Medal summary

Men's events

Women's events

Medal table

References

External links
Official Website

2014 Central American and Caribbean Games events
2014 in taekwondo
Taekwondo at the Central American and Caribbean Games